The following lists events that happened during 1998 in Sudan.

Incumbents
President: Omar al-Bashir
Vice President:
 Ali Osman Taha (First)
 George Kongor Arop (Second)

Events

September
 September 18 - The United Nations condemns Libya, Sudan and the Democratic Republic of the Congo for breaches against the UN's air embargo against Libya.

October
 October 15 - Sudanese refugees flee DRC, bringing themselves to a famine in southern Sudan.

References

 
Years of the 20th century in Sudan
1990s in Sudan
Sudan
Sudan